Tilia amurensis, the Amur lime or Amur linden, is a species of Tilia native to eastern Asia. It differs from the better-known Tilia cordata in having somewhat smaller leaves, bracts and cymes. It is an important timber tree in Russia, China and Korea, and is occasionally planted as a street tree in cities with colder climates.

Description 
The appearance is quite similar to Tilia japonica besides the difference in size of leaves, bracts and a shorter cyme. Tilia amurensis is a hermaphrodite which means it contains both female and male organs and is mainly pollinated by insects.

Habitat 
T. amurensis prefer a medium moisture level as well as fertile well drained loams. It has the ability to adapt to several different ranges of soil conditions as well as a good tolerance for urban conditions . Often found in mixed forests region of China, North Korea, South Korea, Russia and north-east Siberia.

Life cycle 
The leaves of the tree tend to begin to emerge around late spring to early June. In areas with clement winters the tree is known for being badly frosting after emerging early. its life span can span up to 50 years with many going on to live much longer in situations where they are maintained well and barring any diseases and issues that could come about.

Development 
Tilia amurensis can grow up to 32 meters tall with a dark bark color. It has irregular scaled ridges which are shown as it matures. The twigs could be measured (1.3 - 2.6 mm thick). Primarily they start with tangled stellate indumentum which becomes glabrous as they mature. The buds are smooth,with 2 exposed scales. the leaves tend to measure between 4-8 x 4-7 cm orbicular alongside a long skinny tip with a cordata base. The lower base of the leaves are pale green with a loose stellate indumentum and strong tufts with red hair under the vein axils. The teeth with mucronate tips can grow up to 1.2 mm long. with the floral bracts growing to 4-10 cm x 0.5-1.5 cm. The leaves are rather droopy with 10-30 flowers on each pedicel.

Medicine 
Tea can be made from the leaves which has an antispasmodic, diaphoretic and sedative effect.

Food 
Tilia amurensis is not particularly used as a supplement for food. The leaves are edible but it is known as a famine food, which is a source of food only when all else fails. The leaves could also be used to make Tea. It is also known as a substitute for chocolate which made from a paste of the ground fruits and flowers. It has not become a popular product due to the paste decomposing very easily and rapidly.

References
http://temperate.theferns.info/plant/Tilia+amurensis

https://www.missouribotanicalgarden.org/PlantFinder/PlantFinderDetails.aspx?taxonid=287373&isprofile=0&

https://pfaf.org/User/Plant.aspx?LatinName=Tilia+amurensis

amurensis
Flora of the Russian Far East
Trees of China
Trees of Korea
Plants described in 1869